Dingamalarie may refer to:

 Dingamalarie, a southern African word for a non-descript object, akin to "thingamabob", "dooverlackie" or "thingamajig"
 Dingamalarie, see also "Dingus (disambiguation)"